Fernie was the name of a provincial electoral district in the Canadian province of British Columbia centred on the town of Fernie in the southern Rockies.  It made its first appearance on the hustings in the election of 1903.  In a redistribution after the 1963 election the area covered by this riding was incorporated into the new Kootenay riding (same name but smaller than the original 1871-vintage Kootenay riding).

For other current and historical electoral districts in the Kootenay region, please see Kootenay (electoral districts).

Demographics

Political geography

Notable elections

Notable MLAs 

 William Roderick Ross
 Thomas Aubert Uphill - represented Fernie as a Labour MLA for 40 years on behalf of a party named "Labour", of which he was the only successful candidate.

Electoral history 
Note:  Winners of each election are in bold.

|Liberal
|Edwin Clarke Smith
|align="right"|309 	 	
|align="right"|36.52%
|align="right"|
|align="right"|unknown
|- bgcolor="white"
!align="right" colspan=3|Total valid votes
!align="right"|846 	
!align="right"|100.00%
!align="right"|
|- bgcolor="white"
!align="right" colspan=3|Total rejected ballots
!align="right"|
!align="right"|
!align="right"|
|- bgcolor="white"
!align="right" colspan=3|Turnout
!align="right"|%
!align="right"|
!align="right"|
|}

|Liberal
|William Martin Dicken
|align="right"|66 		
|align="right"|9.42%
|align="right"|
|align="right"|unknown

|- bgcolor="white"
!align="right" colspan=3|Total valid votes
!align="right"|701
!align="right"|100.00%
!align="right"|
|- bgcolor="white"
!align="right" colspan=3|Total rejected ballots
!align="right"|
!align="right"|
!align="right"|
|- bgcolor="white"
!align="right" colspan=3|Turnout
!align="right"|%
!align="right"|
!align="right"|
|}

 
|Liberal
|Alexander Ingram Fisher
|align="right"|405 		
|align="right"|21.90%
|align="right"|
|align="right"|unknown

|- bgcolor="white"
!align="right" colspan=3|Total valid votes
!align="right"|1,849
!align="right"|100.00%
!align="right"|
|- bgcolor="white"
!align="right" colspan=3|Total rejected ballots
!align="right"|
!align="right"|
!align="right"|
|- bgcolor="white"
!align="right" colspan=3|Turnout
!align="right"|%
!align="right"|
!align="right"|
|}

|- bgcolor="white"
!align="right" colspan=3|Total valid votes
!align="right"|1,830
!align="right"|100.00%
!align="right"|
|- bgcolor="white"
!align="right" colspan=3|Total rejected ballots
!align="right"|
!align="right"|
!align="right"|
|- bgcolor="white"
!align="right" colspan=3|Turnout
!align="right"|%
!align="right"|
!align="right"|
|}	

 
|Liberal
|Alexander Ingram Fisher
|align="right"|903
|align="right"|46.38%
|align="right"|
|align="right"|unknown

|- bgcolor="white"
!align="right" colspan=3|Total valid votes
!align="right"|1,947 	 	
!align="right"|100.00%
!align="right"|
|- bgcolor="white"
!align="right" colspan=3|Total rejected ballots
!align="right"|
!align="right"|
!align="right"|
|- bgcolor="white"
!align="right" colspan=3|Turnout
!align="right"|%
!align="right"|
!align="right"|
|}

 
|Liberal
|Alexander Ingram Fisher 
|align="right"|723 	 	 		
|align="right"|29.77%
|align="right"|
|align="right"|unknown

 
|Federated Labour Party
|Thomas Aubert Uphill
|align="right"|932
|align="right"|38.37%
|align="right"|
|align="right"|unknown
|- bgcolor="white"
!align="right" colspan=3|Total valid votes
!align="right"|2,429
!align="right"|100.00%
!align="right"|
|- bgcolor="white"
!align="right" colspan=3|Total rejected ballots
!align="right"|
!align="right"|
!align="right"|
|- bgcolor="white"
!align="right" colspan=3|Turnout
!align="right"|%
!align="right"|
!align="right"|
|}

 
|Liberal
|James McLean
|align="right"|641 		 	 		
|align="right"|25.70%
|align="right"|
|align="right"|unknown
 
|Federated Labour Party
|Thomas Aubert Uphill
|align="right"|1,002
|align="right"|40.18%
|align="right"|
|align="right"|unknown
|- bgcolor="white"
!align="right" colspan=3|Total valid votes
!align="right"|2,494
!align="right"|100.00%
!align="right"|
|- bgcolor="white"
!align="right" colspan=3|Total rejected ballots
!align="right"|
!align="right"|
!align="right"|
|- bgcolor="white"
!align="right" colspan=3|Turnout
!align="right"|%
!align="right"|
!align="right"|
|}  	   	

 
|Independent Labour Party 1
|Thomas Aubert Uphill
|align="right"|1,639
|align="right"|59.80%
|align="right"|
|align="right"|unknown
|- bgcolor="white"
!align="right" colspan=3|Total valid votes
!align="right"|2,741 
!align="right"|100.00%
!align="right"|
|- bgcolor="white"
!align="right" colspan=3|Total rejected ballots
!align="right"|67
!align="right"|
!align="right"|
|- bgcolor="white"
!align="right" colspan=3|Turnout
!align="right"|%
!align="right"|
!align="right"|
|- bgcolor="white"
!align="right" colspan=7|1 Labour in Summary of Votes.
|}  	

 
|Liberal
|Michael D. McLean
|align="right"|1,299 	 	 		 	 		
|align="right"|43.42%
|align="right"|
|align="right"|unknown
 
|Labour (Party) 2
|Thomas Aubert Uphill
|align="right"|1,693
|align="right"|56.58%
|align="right"|
|align="right"|unknown
|- bgcolor="white"
!align="right" colspan=3|Total valid votes
!align="right"|2,992 
!align="right"|100.00%
!align="right"|
|- bgcolor="white"
!align="right" colspan=3|Total rejected ballots
!align="right"|26
!align="right"|
!align="right"|
|- bgcolor="white"
!align="right" colspan=3|Turnout
!align="right"|%
!align="right"|
!align="right"|
|- bgcolor="white"
!align="right" colspan=7|2 i.e. "Labour" was the name of the party.
|}

 
|Liberal
|Harry Wilfrid Colgan
|align="right"|1,470 	 	 		 	 		
|align="right"|46.36%
|align="right"|
|align="right"|unknown
 
|Labour (Party)
|Thomas Aubert Uphill
|align="right"|1,701
|align="right"|53.64%
|align="right"|
|align="right"|unknown
|- bgcolor="white"
!align="right" colspan=3|Total valid votes
!align="right"|3,171
!align="right"|100.00%
!align="right"|
|- bgcolor="white"
!align="right" colspan=3|Total rejected ballots
!align="right"|71
!align="right"|
!align="right"|
|- bgcolor="white"
!align="right" colspan=3|Turnout
!align="right"|%
!align="right"|
!align="right"|
|}

 
|Liberal
|Harry Wilfrid Colgan
|align="right"|1,214 		 	 		 	 		
|align="right"|37.70%
|align="right"|
|align="right"|unknown
 
|Co-operative Commonwealth Fed.
|James Lancaster
|align="right"|287 			 	 		 	 		
|align="right"|8.91%
|align="right"|
|align="right"|unknown
 
|Labour (Party)
|Thomas Aubert Uphill
|align="right"|1,719
|align="right"|53.39%
|align="right"|
|align="right"|unknown
|- bgcolor="white"
!align="right" colspan=3|Total valid votes
!align="right"|3,220
!align="right"|100.00%
!align="right"|
|- bgcolor="white"
!align="right" colspan=3|Total rejected ballots
!align="right"|29
!align="right"|
!align="right"|
|- bgcolor="white"
!align="right" colspan=3|Turnout
!align="right"|%
!align="right"|
!align="right"|
|}

 
|Co-operative Commonwealth Fed.
|Kenneth Claude Minifie
|align="right"|742 	 			 	 		 	 		
|align="right"|24.34%
|align="right"|
|align="right"|unknown

 
|Labour (Party)
|Thomas Aubert Uphill
|align="right"|1,289
|align="right"|42.28%
|align="right"|
|align="right"|unknown
|- bgcolor="white"
!align="right" colspan=3|Total valid votes
!align="right"|3,049  
!align="right"|100.00%
!align="right"|
|- bgcolor="white"
!align="right" colspan=3|Total rejected ballots
!align="right"|10
!align="right"|
!align="right"|
|- bgcolor="white"
!align="right" colspan=3|Turnout
!align="right"|%
!align="right"|
!align="right"|
|}

 
|Co-operative Commonwealth Fed.
|Stephen Alexander Fleming
|align="right"|837 	 	 			 	 		 	 		
|align="right"|22.06%
|align="right"|
|align="right"|unknown

 
|Labour (Party)
|Thomas Aubert Uphill
|align="right"|1,483
|align="right"|39.09%
|align="right"|
|align="right"|unknown
|- bgcolor="white"
!align="right" colspan=3|Total valid votes
!align="right"|3,794  
!align="right"|100.00%
!align="right"|
|- bgcolor="white"
!align="right" colspan=3|Total rejected ballots
!align="right"|68
!align="right"|
!align="right"|
|- bgcolor="white"
!align="right" colspan=3|Turnout
!align="right"|%
!align="right"|
!align="right"|
|}

 
|Co-operative Commonwealth Fed.
|Magnus Eliason
|align="right"|612   			 	 		 	 		
|align="right"|16.40%
|align="right"| -
|align="right"| -.- %
|align="right"|
|align="right"|unknown
 
|B.C. Social Credit League
|John Mackenzie Patterson
|align="right"|713    	 			 	 		 	 		
|align="right"|19.11%
|align="right"| -
|align="right"| -.- %
|align="right"|
|align="right"|unknown
 
|Liberal
|Stewart Kenny Nash
|align="right"|1,117           	 			 	 		 	 		
|align="right"|29.93%
|align="right"|1,329
|align="right"|43.05%
|align="right"|
|align="right"|unknown
 
|Labour (Party)
|Thomas Aubert Uphill
|align="right"|1,290
|align="right"|34.57%
|align="right"|1,758
|align="right"|56.95%
|align="right"|
|align="right"|unknown
|- bgcolor="white"
!align="right" colspan=3|Total valid votes
!align="right"|3,732
!align="right"|100.00%
!align="right"|3,087
|align="right"|
|align="right"|
|- bgcolor="white"
!align="right" colspan=3|Total rejected ballots
!align="right"|61
!align="right"|
!align="right"|
!align="right"|
!align="right"|
|- bgcolor="white"
!align="right" colspan=3|Turnout
!align="right"|%
!align="right"|
!align="right"|
!align="right"|
!align="right"|
|- bgcolor="white"
!align="right" colspan=7|3  Preferential ballot.  First and final of three counts only shown.
|}

 
|Liberal
|Henry Cartmell (Harry) McKay
|align="right"|1,229 	 	 	 			 	 		 	 	
|align="right"|34.80%
|align="right"|1,402
|align="right"|43.88%
|align="right"|
|align="right"|unknown

 
|Labour (Party)
|Thomas Aubert Uphill
|align="right"|1,601
|align="right"|45.32%
|align="right"|1,793
|align="right"|56.12%
|align="right"|
|align="right"|unknown
|- bgcolor="white"
!align="right" colspan=3|Total valid votes
!align="right"|3,532
!align="right"|100.00%
!align="right"|3,195
|align="right"|
|align="right"|
|- bgcolor="white"
!align="right" colspan=3|Total rejected ballots
!align="right"|145
!align="right"|
!align="right"|
!align="right"|
!align="right"|
|- bgcolor="white"
!align="right" colspan=3|Turnout
!align="right"|%
!align="right"|
!align="right"|
!align="right"|
!align="right"|
|- bgcolor="white"
!align="right" colspan=7|4  Preferential ballot.  First and second of two counts only shown.
|}

 
|Liberal
|Kenny Nash Stewart
|align="right"|611 	 			 	 		 	 		
|align="right"|19.63%
|align="right"|
|align="right"|unknown
 
|Labour (Party)
|Thomas Aubert Uphill
|align="right"|1,321
|align="right"|42.43%
|align="right"|
|align="right"|unknown
|- bgcolor="white"
!align="right" colspan=3|Total valid votes
!align="right"|3,113 
!align="right"|100.00%
!align="right"|
|- bgcolor="white"
!align="right" colspan=3|Total rejected ballots
!align="right"|112
!align="right"|
!align="right"|
|- bgcolor="white"
!align="right" colspan=3|Turnout
!align="right"|%
!align="right"|
!align="right"|
|}

 
|Liberal
|Henry Cartmell (Harry) McKay
|align="right"|1,126
|align="right"|36.23%
|align="right"|
|align="right"|unknown
 
|CCF
|Lloyd Phillips
|align="right"|864
|align="right"|27.80%
|align="right"|
|align="right"|unknown
 
|Progressive Conservative
|Francis J. Ramage
|align="right"|191
|align="right"|6.15%
|align="right"|
|align="right"|unknown
|- bgcolor="white"
!align="right" colspan=3|Total valid votes
!align="right"|3,108 
!align="right"|100.00%
!align="right"|
|- bgcolor="white"
!align="right" colspan=3|Total rejected ballots
!align="right"|29
!align="right"|
!align="right"|
|- bgcolor="white"
!align="right" colspan=3|Turnout
!align="right"|%
!align="right"|
!align="right"|
|}

 
|Liberal
|Henry Cartmell (Harry) McKay
|align="right"|1,226
|align="right"|41.67%
|align="right"|
|align="right"|unknown

|- bgcolor="white"
!align="right" colspan=3|Total valid votes
!align="right"|2,942 
!align="right"|100.00%
!align="right"|
|- bgcolor="white"
!align="right" colspan=3|Total rejected ballots
!align="right"|22
!align="right"|
!align="right"|
|- bgcolor="white"
!align="right" colspan=3|Turnout
!align="right"|%
!align="right"|
!align="right"|
|}

Following the 1963 election the Fernie riding was redistributed and a new riding, Kootenay was formed (same name as the original 1871 Kootenay riding, but much smaller in scope).  The Kootenay riding combined Fernie with the riding of Cranbrook and parts of the Columbia ridings.

Sources 

Elections BC Historical Returns

Former provincial electoral districts of British Columbia